David Hosking (born 20 January 1941) is a New Zealand cricketer. He played in one first-class match for Wellington in 1967/68.

See also
 List of Wellington representative cricketers

References

External links
 

1941 births
Living people
New Zealand cricketers
Wellington cricketers
Cricketers from Auckland